Brother Act. is the second studio album by South Korean boy group BtoB. It was released on October 16, 2017 by Cube Entertainment and distributed by LOEN Entertainment. The album contains 13 tracks of which 12 tracks were released digitally and an additional track available only on physical album. BTOB members also participated in the album as co-lyricists and co-composers. The lead single "Missing You" is a pop ballad track written and composed by member Im Hyun-sik.

After releasing "Missing You" on 16 October 2017, it has reached 100,929,245 streams on 12 October 2018 according to Gaon's streaming count chart. Among songs released between 2017-2018, "Missing You" is ranked #25 in terms of streaming counts so far  and was voted No.1 trusted song to listen in fall.

Commercial performance

"Missing You" topped for 5 charts after 3 hours its release beating Movie. It also peaked at number two on the Gaon Digital Chart, becoming their highest charting single on the chart. They broke their record for earning NO #1 for 88 hours on Melon after debut. On June 17, 2019 "Missing You" became the 2nd longest charting idol group song on MelOn at 87 weeks.

Track listing

Charts

Music program wins

See also
List of Inkigayo Chart winners (2017)

References

2017 albums
BtoB (band) albums
Cube Entertainment albums
Korean-language albums
Kakao M albums